Scott Armstrong is the current director of Information Trust, a former journalist for The Washington Post, and founder of the National Security Archive. He was a staff member of the Senate Watergate Committee.

With Bob Woodward, he co-authored the 1979 book The Brethren, an inside account of the United States Supreme Court. Before that he was research assistant with Woodward on the latter's co-authored 1976 endeavor The Final Days.

Works 
 Scott Armstrong and Bob Woodward, The Brethren: Inside the Supreme Court, (New York: Simon & Schuster, 1979).
 Scott Armstrong, Malcolm Byrne, and Tom Blanton, The Chronology:  The Documented Day-by-Day account of the Secret Military Assistance to Iran and the Contras, (New York:  Warner Books, 1987).
 Scott Armstrong and Paul Grier, Strategic Defense Initiative: Splendid Defense or Pipe Dream?, (New York:  Foreign Policy Association, 1986).

References

External links 
 Information Trust

 Testimony by Scott Armstrong Director, Information Trust to the United States House of Representatives Committee on Homeland Security Subcommittee on Intelligence, Information Sharing and Terrorism Risk Assessment; March 22, 2007

Living people
American investigative journalists
American newspaper reporters and correspondents
American political writers
American male non-fiction writers
Journalists from Washington, D.C.
The Washington Post people
Year of birth missing (living people)
Place of birth missing (living people)
Watergate scandal investigators